Gudipati Venkatachalam (1894–1979), popularly known as Chalam, was an Indian Telugu-language writer and philosopher. He was considered to be one of the most influential personalities in modern Telugu literature.

Most of Chalam's work was regarding  women, especially the kind of difficulties women encountered in the society, both physical and psychological. Chalam's work discussed how he believed women should face these problems. His writing had a distinctive style which would earn him an enviable place in the Telugu literary world.

Chalam's writings have been celebrated by his contemporaries and are a growing influence among writers of the current generation as well.

Life 
Much that is known about Chalam's childhood comes from his 1972 autobiography titled Chalam. In it, he vividly mentions how he suffered beatings from his father and how his mother, residing at her parents’ home (in Tenali) even after getting married and starting a family with her husband, who belongs to Valluripalem of Krishna district, had to face a flurry of insults. Chalam brazenly puts across why he wrote his autobiography in its foreword:

 "I hate autobiographies. By writing an autobiography, I am admitting to myself and indirectly telling everybody that I am an important person, I made lots of good things to help people and society and if I do not tell the world about myself, there is great loss to the world and by not knowing about me, the world is losing something. For a person like me who always thinks and wonders, "Why was I born? And OK, I was born but why I did not die immediately without polluting my surroundings? Writing an autobiography and telling my story shamelessly is not a matter to be excused [...]"

Birth and childhood 
Gudipati Venkata Chalam was born on 18 May 1894 in Krishna district in India. His mother was Venkata Subbamma and his father was Kommuri Sambasivarao. He was mainly raised in Tenali after his maternal grandfather adopted him and changed his surname from "Kommuri" to "Gudipati". He was an avid practitioner of Hindu rituals and committed himself to an exhaustive study of Hindu epics as well as Hindu doctrinal teachings. The way his father abused his mother made an indelible impression on his young mind. Besides this, the manner in which his sister "Ammanni" (Venkata Ramanamma, Dulla) was coerced into an arranged marriage also made him concentrate on the difficulties that women faced in society.

Education, marriage and employment 
Chalam joined Pithapuram Maharaja College in 1911. At that time, he was attracted by the preachings of Raghupati Venkata Ratnam Naidu—a social reformer and the founder of Brahma Samaj in Andhra Pradesh. Chalam went to Chennai to study for his Bachelor of Arts degree. Before joining the college, he was married to Chitti Ranganayakamma. During his stay in Chennai, he got his wife admitted into a convent for her education and used to drop her at school on his bicycle. Chalam stopped wearing the sacred thread (Yagnopaveetham) and started incorporating non-vegetarian food into his diet (Brahmins were strict vegetarians). He mingled with members of all castes which infuriated his relatives and more so his father-in-law who banished him from entering his house. At the time, Chalam's wife's age was merely 13. When his mother-in-law died, Chalam and his friends were not allowed in his father-in-law's house for the funeral, and were served food outside.

After completing his studies in Madras, Chalam joined in a job as tutor in Kakinada and started participating in the Brahma Samaj activities. He worked as a teacher in Karimnagar then joined in a job with Teacher's Training College in Rajahmundry. He later became a school inspector. About his job, Chalam wrote in his famous book "Musings" (in Telugu language) (Page 72, 5th Print in 2005) as follows:

I am a stone, slave of the government, school inspector and for the poor mice like teachers, I am the cat.

Chalam's daughter
Chalam's daughter, Souris, a devotee of Ramana Maharshi, maintains an ashram at Bheemili, Visakhapatnam.

Bibliography

Novels
 Maidanam
 Sasirekha
 Dyvamicchina bharya
 Jeevitadarsam
 Brahmanikam
 Vivaham
 Aruna
 Anusuya
 Ameena

Short story collections
 Jealousy
 Aa rathri
 Prema paryavasanam
 Satyam Sivam Sundaram
 Vedantam
 Doshagunam
 Maadiga ammayi
 maamagari maryada
 mukkaalupeeta
 mukthimaargam
 mosamchesindha
 yavvanavvanam
 rasaputhrulu
 raamabakthudu
 raavanadarshanam
 reddyrangamma
 lancham
 lakshimdevi
 lakshmiuthharam
 villytho snejam ela ayyindante?
 vaani-a-study
 vaallu naluguru
 vichitranaleeyam
 vithanthuvu
 vennelathotalu
 vendantham
 vontarithanam
 shamantakamanitho interview
 sheshamma
 saraswathee prasannam
 cinema saayam
 seethathalli
 seethayya
 sugandhi
 susheela
 stationpampu
 hamko mohabbath
 hampeekanyalu
 hathya vicharana
 harijana vidhyardhi
 harijana samasya
 hindhumusalmaan
 nakshatrakaanthi
 kamalaanehru samadhi vadda
 anusooya

Nonfiction
 Musings
 Papam
 Prema Lekhalu
 Stree
 Biddala Shikshana

The novel Maidanam made an indelible mark on the reader for its free and frank way of expression, the relationship between man and woman disregarding caste and creed.

Philosophy 
Chalam was a strong critic of the fundamental societal architecture of his time. He believed that the barriers created by the society precluded love and mutual understanding from human relationships.

In a society that believed in children being indebted to their parents, he proclaimed caring for and bringing up of children as the fundamental duty as parents.

He was widely shunned during his times especially for his advocacy of women's rights and his total rejection of the family system.

Adaptations 
His Short story Doshagunam was adapted as a Telugu movie Grahanam.

Quotes 
 From Brahmanikam: to be verified
Stri oka mata valla, chupu vallaa purushuniki Spandichindaa....ika atani adhikaraniki, korikalaki, vinnapalaki antam undadu. Asalu paryavasanam akkarleni stri modatininchi vimukhamgane undali......nippu vale undali, kaalanu kudadani chala mandi moorkhula aasa...

స్త్రీ ఒక మాట వల్ల,చూపు వల్లా పురుషునికి స్పందించిందా....ఇక అతని అధికారానికి, కోరికలకి, విన్నపాలకి అంతం ఉండదు. అసలు పర్యవసానం అక్కర్లేని స్త్రీ మొదటినించి విముఖంగానే ఉండాలి......నిప్పు వలె ఉండాలి, ...

References

External links 
 Chalam
 About Chalam

1894 births
1979 deaths
20th-century Indian novelists
Writers from Chennai
Telugu writers
Indian male novelists
Novelists from Tamil Nadu